To a Tee is a 2006 film written and directed by Matt Riddlehoover and starring Riddlehoover with Lindsey Hancock and Jonas Brandon. It has been described as “Annie Hall meets Will & Grace”. The film's sharply edited theatrical trailer sparked much attention on the Web, specifically on MySpace.

Plot
Matt Riddlehoover wrote, directed, edited and stars in this seriocomic feature about a gay playwright who feeds off his stubborn attraction to the wrong type of guy (played in multiple roles by Jonas Brandon). When he attracts the attention of a newspaper columnist (Lindsey Hancock) who will champion his work, success seems guaranteed until he meets her boyfriend - played by Brandon. The film excels in Riddlehoover's delivery as the self-absorbed, flawed hero. His timing is impressive, given that he was also directing himself. Winner of the MySpace Film User's Choice Award.

References

External links
 
 Matt Riddlehoover on Myspace
 Out.com Review''

2006 films
American LGBT-related films
2000s English-language films
2000s American films